Ridgeciano Haps (born 12 June 1993) is a professional footballer who plays as a left-back for  club Genoa, on loan from Venezia. Born in the Netherlands, he represents the Suriname national team.

Club career
Born in Utrecht, Haps is of Surinamese descent. He came through the youth system of AZ where he established himself as a consistent performer at left-back in the Eredivisie.

In summer 2017, he joined Feyenoord. On 22 April 2018, he played as Feyenoord won the 2017–18 KNVB Cup final 3–0 against AZ Alkmaar.

On 31 August 2021, after making exactly 100 competitive appearances for Feyenoord, Haps joined newly promoted Serie A club Venezia in a permanent deal. At home in matchday 12, Haps acrobatically defused a header by Shomurodov on the goal line against Roma. An important moment, because the home team took over the game in the remainder of the second half.

On 31 January 2023, Haps moved on loan to Genoa, with an option to buy.

International career
On 4 June 2021, Haps made his international debut for Suriname against Bermuda. He provided an assist in the 6–0 win. A few weeks later on June 25, he was called up to the squad for the 2021 CONCACAF Gold Cup.

Honours
Feyenoord
 KNVB Cup: 2017–18
Johan Cruijff Shield: 2017, 2018

References

External links
 
 Voetbal International profile 

1993 births
Dutch sportspeople of Surinamese descent
Living people
Footballers from Utrecht (city)
Surinamese footballers
Suriname international footballers
Dutch footballers
Netherlands youth international footballers
Association football fullbacks
USV Elinkwijk players
AZ Alkmaar players
Go Ahead Eagles players
Feyenoord players
Venezia F.C. players
Genoa C.F.C. players
Eredivisie players
Serie A players
Serie B players
2021 CONCACAF Gold Cup players
Surinamese expatriate footballers
Expatriate footballers in Italy
Surinamese expatriate sportspeople in Italy